Sir John Young Walker MacAlister (10 May 1856 – 1 December 1925) was a Scottish journalist, editor, librarian, and promoter of medical postgraduate education. He was the Secretary of the Royal Society of Medicine from 1901 to 1925 and one of the promoters of the Society's formation.

Education and career
John Y. W. MacAlister was educated at the Liverpool Institute High School for Boys and at the University of Edinburgh. He studied medicine for three years at the University of Edinburgh, but ill-health prevented him from completing his medical education. He was a sub-librarian for the Liverpool Library from 1877 to 1880 and a librarian for the Leeds Library from 1880 to 1887.

He worked as a journalist for the Leeds Mercury and the Yorkshire Post. In 1889 he became the founder, owner and editor of the journal The Library. From 1887 to 1889 he was the Honorary Secretary for the Library Association and in 1889 obtained a Royal Charter for the Association.

During WW I, MacAlister was Honorary Secretary of the War Office's Surgical Advisory Committee and also Organiser and Honorary Secretary of the Emergency Surgical Aid Corps for the Admiralty, War Office, and Metropolitan Police. In recognition of his work during WW I, he was knighted in 1919.

Family
John Y. W. Macalister was a brother of Sir Donald MacAlister. John Y. W. Macalister married Elizabeth Batley on 7 January 1875 in Edinburgh. They had two sons; their elder son was Donald Alexander MacAlister.

References

External links

1856 births
1925 deaths
Scottish librarians
Scottish journalists
Scottish editors
Scottish educators
Scottish knights
Writers from Perth, Scotland
People educated at Liverpool Institute High School for Boys
Alumni of the University of Edinburgh Medical School